Rock-a-bye Baby is a nursery rhyme and lullaby.

Rock-a-bye Baby may also refer to:

 Rock-A-Bye Baby (film), a 1958 American musical comedy starring Jerry Lewis
 Rockabye Baby!, a series of CDs geared toward infants and newborns
 RockaByeBaby, a mixtape by American singer Cassie
 "Rock-A-Bye Baby", a song by Irving Berlin

See also
 Rock-a-Bye Your Baby with a Dixie Melody, a popular song written by Jean Schwartz
 Rockaway Valley Railroad, also known as the "Rock-A-Bye Baby"
 Rockabye (disambiguation)